A list of Hong Kong films released in 2013:

References

External links
 IMDB list of Hong Kong films 
 Hong Kong films of 2013 at HKcinemamagic.com

2013
Films
Hong Kong